Three Little Words is a 1950 American musical film biography of the Tin Pan Alley songwriting partnership of Kalmar and Ruby. It stars Fred Astaire as lyricist Bert Kalmar and Red Skelton as composer Harry Ruby, along with Vera-Ellen and Arlene Dahl as their wives, with Debbie Reynolds in a small but notable role as singer Helen Kane and Gloria DeHaven as her own mother, Mrs. Carter DeHaven. The film, released by Metro-Goldwyn-Mayer, was written by Academy-Award-winning screenwriter George Wells, directed by Richard Thorpe and produced by Jack Cummings. Harry Ruby served as a consultant on the project, and he appears in a cameo role as a baseball catcher. The third in a series of MGM biopics about Broadway composers, it was preceded by Till the Clouds Roll By (Jerome Kern, 1946) and Words and Music (Rodgers and Hart, 1948) and followed by Deep in My Heart (Sigmund Romberg, 1954).

Plot

Cast
 Fred Astaire as Bert Kalmar
 Red Skelton as Harry Ruby
 Vera-Ellen as Jessie Brown
 Anita Ellis as Jessie Brown (singing voice) (uncredited)
 Arlene Dahl as Eileen Percy
 Keenan Wynn as Charlie Kope
 Gale Robbins as Terry Lordel
 Gloria DeHaven as Mrs. Carter De Haven
 Phil Regan as himself
 Harry Shannon as Clanahan
 Debbie Reynolds as Helen Kane
 Helen Kane as herself (singing voice) (uncredited)
 Paul Harvey as Al Masters
 Carleton Carpenter as Dan Healy
 George Metkovich as Al Schacht
 Harry Mendoza as himself

This warm and engaging film was one of Astaire's favorites, possibly because of the nostalgic vaudeville connection.
As Hollywood film biographies of the period go, it takes fewer liberties with the facts than usual, and Astaire and 
Skelton's onscreen portrayal of the partnership is considered psychologically accurate, complemented by a mutual chemistry, some quality acting by both, and some fine comedy touches by Skelton.  Unusually for Hollywood songwriting biographies of this period, two of the songs, "Thinking of You" and "Nevertheless", became major hits on the film's release, reaching first and second place respectively, in the U.S. charts.

In recognition of his acting performance, Fred Astaire was awarded the first Golden Globe Award for Best Actor - Motion Picture Musical or Comedy in 1951.

Key songs/dance routines
This film provides an object lesson in how to integrate the many songs and dances seamlessly and naturally into the script 
- a principle first introduced into the Hollywood musical by Astaire as far back as 1934. Astaire's choreography takes the opportunity provided by Vera-Ellen's technical prowess to showcase dance routines notable for leg kicks, lifts and  - Astaire's innovative combination of the two - the hurdling lift, first invented for "The Yam" number in Carefree (1938). These routines are contrasted with some choreographically primitive numbers typical of vaudeville c. 1920. The spirit of the partnered dances expands on the theme of marital contentment previously explored in The Story of Vernon and Irene Castle (1939) and the prior year's The Barkleys of Broadway (1949). Vera-Ellen's singing voice was dubbed by Anita Ellis.
 
 "Where Did You Get That Girl?": Astaire and Vera-Ellen, dressed in top hat, white tie and tails, impersonate the vaudeville partnership of Kalmar and Brown with this genial song and dance duet set around 1919. (The song itself dates to 1913 and was written by Kalmar and an earlier partner, Harry Puck, before the lyricist teamed with Ruby.) Fred and Adele Astaire had greatly admired the Kalmar-Brown partnership: "We used to stand in the wings and watch Jessie and Bert with thrilled envy, wondering if we could equal their finesse and reach their headline billing". The routine is very straightforward, and when contrasted with the creations of Astaire, Gene Kelly and others, illustrates the profound evolution popular dance had undergone in the intervening period. Incidentally Ruby, working as a song plugger, had once played tunes for the Astaire siblings.
 "Mr. and Mrs. Hoofer At Home": A hectic and high-kicking comic dance duet for Astaire and Vera-Ellen which is set in a suburban family living room and portrays the various challenges of contented domesticity. The routine, which, in contrast to the previous one, is thoroughly modern in conception, is nonetheless shown performed at the Keith's Theatre (which later became the K in RKO) in Washington, D.C. in the presence of President Woodrow Wilson, a noted vaudeville fan.
 "My Sunny Tennessee": Astaire and Skelton deliver a version of this 1921 hit. 
 "So Long, OO-Long": Kalmar and Ruby's 1920 Oriental-themed ditty is performed by Astaire and Skelton.
 "Who's Sorry Now?": This 1923 Kalmar and Ruby standard was sung by Gloria DeHaven.
 "Test Solo": Danced by Astaire, initially to a spare piano accompaniment by André Previn and then to the music of "Where Did You Get That Girl?". This was his fifth tap and cane solo, the first being "Top Hat, White Tie and Tails" from Top Hat (1935), followed by "I Can't Be Bothered Now" from A Damsel in Distress (1937), the "Audition Dance" from You Were Never Lovelier (1942), and "Puttin' On The Ritz" from Blue Skies (1946), - all remarkably dissimilar in execution. In the beginning of the solo, Astaire places his hat on top of a light stand and then waves to it. One year later, in "Sunday Jumps" from Royal Wedding (1951) he would take a clotheshorse into his arms and dance with it.
 "Come On Papa": Another high-kicking song and dance routine, this time for Vera-Ellen and chorus of sailors, to a 1918 song by Ruby and Edgar Leslie.
 "Nevertheless (I'm in Love with You)": Kalmar and Ruby's 1931 song is performed on stage by Astaire and Vera-Ellen to Skelton's piano accompaniment.
 "All Alone Monday": Gale Robbins delivers a performance of Kalmar and Ruby's 1926 ballad.
 "I Wanna Be Loved by You": Debbie Reynolds, in one of her earliest film appearances, performs this 1928 number with Carleton Carpenter, with Reynolds dubbed by the original boop-boop-a-doop girl Helen Kane (uncredited).
 "Thinking of You": One of the dance highlights of the film is this romantic partnered routine for Astaire and Vera-Ellen, which follows after Ellen's (dubbed) performance of this 1927 standard. The dance begins quietly and affectionately in a lounge area, and gradually builds becoming progressively more extrovert until the music changes into a rumba - the Latin dance of love - and Astaire embarks on a further exploration of the possibilities of blending Latin and ballroom dance styles, which he had first been inspired to undertake during his celebrated partnership with Rita Hayworth. After this departure - which illustrates the passion than can continue to flourish long after the married nuptials - the dance subsides into a tender coda, recalling its opening mood.
 "I Love You So Much":  Arlene Dahl, accompanied by a chorus of top-hatted men, sings and dances her way through  this number originally written for the 1930 film version of The Ramblers (later retitled The Cuckoos).
 "Medley" (incl. "Three Little Words": In this closing scene, Astaire and Skelton perform a medley of most of the songs featured in the film, ending with "Three Little Words" - Kalmar having finally found a suitable lyric for Ruby's melody, a running gag throughout most of the film.

Contemporary reviews
The New York Times, August 10, 1950: "There is a special quality about the new picture...which deserves immediate mention in detail. That is the polished performance of Fred Astaire as Bert Kalmar... Mr. Astaire has been wearing out thin-soled dancing shoes at a great pace over the years while most of us have grown a little heavier and somewhat slower of foot. But, he hasn't changed. Still lithe in appearance, Mr. Astaire has drawn rich dividends from time and is dancing in peak form...In talking of the fine dancing contributed by Mr. Astaire we forgot to mention how engagingly they carry off the romantic interest and bust into song when the script demands it."
Variety, July 12, 1950: Stal.:"For Astaire, it's unquestionably his best picture in sometime. His terping, as always, is tops, his singing is adequate and his characterisation of Kalmar, while never deeply-etched, does full justice to the late songwriter's many talents...Vera-Ellen, with this picture, becomes the undisputed premiere danseuse of the screen. She matches Astaire tap for tap...and looks to be the best partner he's ever had."

Box office
According to MGM records the film earned $3,019,000 in the US and Canada and $1,507,000 elsewhere, resulting in a healthy profit of $1,252,000.

Accolades
The film is recognized by American Film Institute in these lists:
 2006: AFI's Greatest Movie Musicals – Nominated

References

External links
 
 
 
 
 
 

1950 films
1950 musical films
1950s biographical films
American biographical films
American musical films
1950s English-language films
Films about composers
Films directed by Richard Thorpe
Films featuring a Best Musical or Comedy Actor Golden Globe winning performance
Films scored by André Previn
Jukebox musical films
Metro-Goldwyn-Mayer films
Films with screenplays by George Wells
1950s American films